Peter Davison (born 1951) is a British actor.

Peter Davison may also refer to:

Peter Davison (composer) (born 1948), American new age composer
Peter Davison (footballer) (born 1944), Australian rules footballer
Peter Davison (poet) (1928–2004), American poet
Peter Davison (literary scholar) (1926–2022), professor of English and biographer
Peter Weimer Davison (1869–1920), American general

See also
Peter Davidson (disambiguation)